IIPF may refer to:

 The International Institute of Public Finance, a world organization for Public Finance economists
 Islamic Iran Participation Front, a reformist political party in Iran